Jells Park is a public park in Wheelers Hill, a southeastern suburb of Melbourne, Victoria, Australia. The park opened on 30 April 1976 and is named after Joseph Jell, a cattle grazier who worked in the area in the mid-late 1800s. The park attracts in excess of 900,000 visitors a year.

Ecology
Whilst a significant part of Jells Park has been cleared and revegetated, its biodiversity is still significant, forming part of the Dandenong Creek wildlife corridor. Under the ecological vegetation class system, it is predominantly swampy woodland and swampy riparian woodland.

The park is home to the man-made Jells Lake, with two jetties where recreational fishing is a popular activity. European carp are present in large numbers in the wetland and have become a significant concern for its biodiversity. The lake is abutted by a grassed picnic area on the northwest, whilst an area of remnant bush surrounds the rest of the lake. This bush also contains a bird hide which can be used to spot a variety of native bird species such as Australasian swamphens, pelicans, Eurasian coots, dusky moorhens, and several species of ducks.

Paths

Jells Park contains an extensive network of shared use paths for cycling, walking, and running. The Dandenong Creek Trail runs north—south through the park. Scotchmans Creek Trail also runs through the park from the west, connecting with Dandenong Creek Trail in the south east corner. EastLink Trail skirts the southern edge of the park. A little further north of the park, the Blind Creek Trail comes in from the east and also terminates at the Dandenong Creek Trail.

The Conservation Trail follows the eastern side of the lake past billabongs and wetlands. The bird hide is accessible from this path.

Most trails through the park are paved but some are firm gravel. Paths are generally well signposted and suitable for prams. Dogs are permitted on-lead in much of the park, except for the areas of remnant bushland where they are prohibited.

Facilities

The park is popular for picnics and barbecues, with playgrounds at Yabby Hill. In late 2018, the remaining wood-burning barbecues were removed in favour of the newer gas ones, leaving eight gas barbecues remaining. The park incorporates the following picnic areas:

There is a visitor centre in the north west of the park which is run by Parks Victoria and incorporates a cafe and toilet block.

Two ovals in the south of the park are frequently used for sporting activities and are open for public access at other times.

References

External links
 Jells Park at Parks Victoria
 Jells Park visitor guide at Parks Victoria
 

Parks in Melbourne
1976 establishments in Australia
City of Monash